Campbellton is a town in Jackson County, Florida, United States. The population was 230 at the 2010 census.

Geography

Campbellton is located in northwestern Jackson County at  (30.948587, –85.396472). It sits on a small hill at the junction of U.S. Route 231 and Florida State Road 2. US-231 leads north  to Dothan, Alabama, and south  to Panama City. SR 2 leads east from Campbellton  to Malone and west  to Graceville. SR 273 leads southwest from Campbellton  to Chipley.

History
Campbellton was the site of a small skirmish on September 26, 1864, during the waning days of the Civil War. Local Confederate cavalry under the command of Captain Alexander Goodwin unsuccessfully contested the advance of a Federal column led by Brigadier General Alexander Asboth during the preliminary phase of what would become the Battle of Marianna.

The nearby Forks of the Creek Swamp, along the border with Alabama, was a refuge for many Unionist and Confederate deserters during the war. Joseph Sanders, a former Confederate officer who had switched sides and taken a commission as a lieutenant in the Union army, hid out in the swamp for four months during the winter and spring of 1864; he emerged in March of that year to mount an unsuccessful attack on Newton, Alabama, which resulted in the loss of three of his men. Repeated Southern efforts to dislodge the Unionists in the swamp proved unsuccessful.

Demographics

2020 census

As of the 2020 United States census, there were 191 people, 97 households, and 66 families residing in the town.

2000 census
As of the census of 2000, there were 212 people, 90 households, and 65 families residing in the town. The population density was 238.3 inhabitants per square mile (92.0/km2). The racial makeup of the town was 39.62% White, 59.91% African American, 0.47% from other races. Hispanic or Latino of any race were 0.47% of the population.

There were 90 households, out of which 27.8% had children under the age of 18 living with them, 48.9% were married couples living together, 22.2% had a female householder with no husband present, and 26.7% were non-families. 26.7% of all households were made up of individuals, and 15.6% had someone living alone who was 65 years of age or older.  The average household size was 2.36 and the average family size was 2.83.

In the town, the population was spread out, with 23.6% under the age of 18, 4.7% from 18 to 24, 26.4% from 25 to 44, 28.3% from 45 to 64, and 17.0% who were 65 years of age or older.  The median age was 41 years. For every 100 females, there were 96.3 males.  For every 100 females age 18 and over, there were 80.0 males.

The median income for a household in the town was $22,212, and the median income for a family was $26,875. Males had a median income of $31,250 versus $19,792 for females. The per capita income for the town was $12,139.  About 20.0% of families and 16.6% of the population were below the poverty line, including 16.9% of those under the age of eighteen and 17.1% of those 65 or over.

References

External links

Towns in Jackson County, Florida
Towns in Florida